Parasgad Fort is a ruined hill fort in the Belgaum district of Karnataka state, India. magnificent fort of Parashghad, dating back to the 10th century  and built by famous rulers of Ratta dynasty 
Parasgad Fort is located about two kilometres south of Saundatti village, and stands on the south-west edge of a range of hills immediately overlooking the black soil plain down below.

Its sides are rocky and almost perpendicular. A deep gorge runs through it.

Atop the hill-fort is a small ruined shrine to the Hindu deity Maruthi. The fort itself is uninhabited, and the remains of old houses are located in it.

A descent of several hundred steps leads to Yadravi village. This passes by a natural spring with a water tank measuring thirty by six metres called the Ramatheertha, and a cave housing statues of Hindu deities and mythological figures including Jamadagni, Parashurama, Rama, and Sita, a Shivalinga with a Nandi. The village of Yadravi is referred to as "Elarame" in an inscription found on a platform near the Bharamappa temple of the village. The inscription is dated Shaka 901 in the Hindu calendar.

More images of the fort

See also
 North Karnataka
 Tourism in North Karnataka
 Saundatti
 Hooli
 Shirasangi
 Navilateertha
 Sogal

External links

Parasgad Fort – tourist information at the Karnataka government portal

Forts in Belagavi district